Löw (or Loew) is a surname of German and Yiddish origin. Another romanization of the Yiddish name לייב is Leib. It may refer to:

People
Benjamin Wolf Löw (1775–1851), a Polish-Hungarian rabbi
Franklin M. Loew (1939-2003), a veterinarian
Hermann Loew (1807–1879), a German entomologist
Immanuel Löw (1854–1944), a Hungarian rabbi, scholar and politician
Isaak Löw Hofmann, Edler von Hofmannsthal (1759-1849), an Austrian merchant
Jiri Lev (born Löw 1979), Czech-Australian architect and humanitarian
Joachim Löw (born 1960), a German former footballer, current head coach of the national football team of Germany
Judah Loew ben Bezalel (c. 1520–1609), the "Maharal of Prague", creator the Golem of Prague
Maj-Lis Lööw (born 1936), Swedish politician
Marcus Loew, an American business magnate and a pioneer of the motion picture industry
 Mattias Löw (born 1970), a Swedish film director
Michael Loew (1907–1985), an abstract expressionist artist
Moritz Löw (Lőw Móric) (1841–1900), a Hungarian-German astronomer
Oscar Loew (1844–1941), a German chemist
Peter Oliver Loew (born 1967), German historian
Samuel Löw (1720–1806), a Czech Talmudist
Samuel Löw Brill, a Hungarian rabbi and Talmud scholar
Zsolt Lőw (born 1979), a Hungarian footballer

See also 
 Loews (disambiguation)
 Loewe (disambiguation) 
 Löwe (disambiguation)
 Loeb (disambiguation)

Jewish given names
German given names
Jewish surnames
German-language surnames
Levite surnames
Yiddish-language surnames
Surnames from nicknames